Bruno Amstad (born 1964 in Stans) is a Swiss singer in the field of improvisation and jazz.

Life and Works 
Amstad was at first as soul, funk and rock singer in the 80s. Then, he changed his genre to jazz and world music. Christy Doran took him in his project New Bag. He was active in the project for twelve years (with Wolfgang Zwiauer, Fabian Kuratli, Hans-Peter Pfammatter, Dominik Burkhalter and Vincent Membrez). In this project, seven albums were created from 1999 to 2011.

Also, he sang in Asita Hamidi's group, Bazaar. He became an important figure of world music in Switzerland, He belongs to Sandro Schneebeli's international project, Scala Mobile (along with Antonello Messina and Paul McCandless).

In the last twenty years, Amstad has collaborated with several bands and projects in more than fifty countries. Among the musician, whom he has worked with, it can be mentioned Fredy Studer, Phil Minton, Lauren Newton, John Zorn, Christian Weber/Joke Lanz, DJ Olive or Martin Baumgartner. In recent years, Amstad has performed more in theater, movie and radio projects. He has cooperated with the Werkstatt für Theater Luzern for several years. Also, he has worked with Albin Brun for theater.

References 

Swiss jazz singers
World music singers
1964 births
Living people